Fleuré may refer to the following places in France:

 Fleuré, Orne, a commune in the Orne department
 Fleuré, Vienne, a commune in the Vienne department

See also 
 H. J. Fleure (1877–1969), British zoologist and geographer